Pihlajamäki is a Finnish surname that may refer to

Hermanni Pihlajamäki (1903–1982), Finnish wrestler
Kustaa Pihlajamäki (1902–1944), Finnish wrestler, cousin of Hermanni
Valtteri Pihlajamäki (born 1996), Finnish professional ice hockey right winger

Finnish-language surnames